In Russian language and culture, "former people" are people who lost their social status, an expression somewhat similar to the English one, "has-beens". The expression went into a wide circulation in the Russian Empire after the 1897 short story of Maxim Gorky, Бывшие люди, translated in English as Creatures That Once Were Men, about people fallen from prosperity into an abyss of misery. After the October Revolution, the expression referred to people who lost their social status after the revolution: aristocracy, imperial military, bureaucracy, clergy, etc.

Background
While the "former people" of Gorky were the object of pity and compassion, from the very first days of the Soviet power, the "former people" in the new meaning had become a target of severe persecution of various kinds. In fact, during the wave of repressions after the assassination of Sergey Kirov, NKVD carried out Operation "Former People", in the course of which during March 1935 over 11,000 of "former people" were arrested or deported from Leningrad (whose Communist Party organization Kirov headed and where he was killed), according to Directive № 29 of February 27, 1935, "On the eviction of a counter-revolutionary element from Leningrad and suburban areas to remote areas of the country.". In April, NKVD chief  Genrikh Yagoda expanded the scope of the operation to cleanse the border region of Leningrad Oblast and Karelian ASSR from further 22,000 "formers". Further 8,000 were deported from the area during the so-called "passport operations".

During the peak of the Great Purge, the cleansing of the country from the "former people" was explained by the necessity to eliminate the "insurgence base" in the case of a war.

The 1939 NKVD Order No. 001223, which established the detailed bureaucratic procedures for keeping track of "anti-Soviet and socially alien elements", defined the category of "former people" as follows: "former tsarist and White Army administration, former dvoryans [Russian nobility], pomeshchiks (noble landowners), merchants and petty merchants, those who employ hired labor, industrialists, and others".

The number of "former people" was in the millions. According to various estimates, in 1913 in Russia, there were between 22 and 35 million relatively wealthy people, counting both urban and rural population.

Historian Douglas Smith's book, Former People: The Final Days of the Russian Aristocracy, traces the calamities of two representative aristocratic families, the Golitsyns and the Sheremetevs. Additionally, Amor Towles' novel A Gentleman in Moscow chronicles the tale of a former person imprisoned in the Moscow hotel Metropol for much of his adult life.

See also
New People (Cambodia)
Lishenets
Ci-devant

References

Further reading

Social groups of Russia
Social history of Russia
Political repression in the Soviet Union
Forced migration in the Soviet Union